Macropyralis is a monotypic snout moth genus described by Hans Georg Amsel in 1953. Its single species, Macropyralis gigantalis, described by the same author, is found in Mauritania.

References

Pyralinae
Monotypic moth genera
Moths of Africa
Pyralidae genera
Taxa named by Hans Georg Amsel